is a public university in Ōita, Ōita, Japan, established in 1998.

External links
 Official website 

Educational institutions established in 1998
Public universities in Japan
Universities and colleges in Ōita Prefecture
1998 establishments in Japan